is the bass player and backing vocalist of the Japanese rock band Asian Kung-Fu Generation. Yamada met fellow band members Masafumi Gotoh and Kensuke Kita while attending a music club of Kanto Gakuin University. The three formed Asian Kung-Fu Generation in 1996, with drummer Kiyoshi Ijichi joining the band shortly after.

While Gotoh acts the main songwriter of the band, Yamada has composed music for certain songs, such as After Dark, Re:Re:, Siren and Sore dewa, Mata Ashita. He retains a degree in literature and his favourite bands are The Beatles, Oasis, The Smashing Pumpkins and Pet Shop Boys. Yamada also contribute for other musician projects. In 2014, he arranged a song for Rina Katahira, "HIGH FIVE" and performed together with his bandmate Kita. In 2021, he composed and arranged Nacherry's debut single "Fortune Teller" and performed together with his bandmate Ijichi.

Discography

Asian Kung-Fu Generation

Other 
 Rina Katahira – "Baby" (2013) arranger
 Rina Katahira – Amazing Sky (2014) arranger on "HIGH FIVE", " CROSS ROAD", and "Hajimari ni"
 Gotch - "Vegetable" (2021) bass
 Nacherry – Cherry Sunday (2021) bass, composer and arranger on "Fortune Teller" and "Happy Nacherry Birthday"
 Nacherry – Now Loading (2022) arranger on "Brave?"
 Nacherry – "Kids Are Too Late (2022) composer

References

Living people
1977 births
Japanese rock bass guitarists
Japanese male rock singers
Asian Kung-Fu Generation members
Kanto Gakuin University alumni
Male bass guitarists
21st-century bass guitarists

Musicians from Shizuoka Prefecture